The Hill Where Lionesses Roar is a drama film, directed by Luàna Bajrami and released in 2021. A coproduction of companies from France and Kosovo, the film centres on Qe (Flaka Latifi), Jeta (Urate Shabani) and Li (Era Balaj), three teenage girls in Kosovo who form a gang and engage in petty crime as they impatiently await their opportunity to go away to university and escape the boredom of their smalltown life.

An excerpt from the film was screened in the Work in Progress section of the Les Arcs Film Festival in 2019.

The film premiered in the Directors' Fortnight program at the 2021 Cannes Film Festival, where it was a nominee for the Queer Palm. It had its North American premiere at the 2021 Toronto International Film Festival.

References

External links

2021 films
2021 drama films
2021 LGBT-related films
French coming-of-age drama films
French LGBT-related films
LGBT-related drama films
Kosovan drama films
Films shot in Kosovo
Films set in Kosovo
2020s French films